Samuela Vatuniveivuke Kerevi (born 27 September 1993) is a Fijian-born Australian rugby union player currently playing for Suntory Sungoliath in the Japanese Top League. His usual position is centre. He previously played for the Queensland Reds in Super Rugby and has played for the Australian national team.

Family and early life
Samuela Kerevi was born in Viseisei, Fiji. He moved with his family to Australia at aged 4. His father, Nimilote Kerevi, is a former Fiji international soccer player. His brother Josua Kerevi has also played representative rugby.

Kerevi attended Brisbane State High School, and represented Queensland at the Australian Schools Rugby Championships in 2011.

Kerevi obtained Australian citizenship in August 2016.

Rugby career

In 2012, Samu Kerevi (his ref name was Musashi) played Premier Rugby for GPS Old Boys in Brisbane. He was selected alongside his brother Josua in the Fiji Under-20 team for the 2012 IRB Junior World Championship in South Africa. In the opening pool match against Wales, he scored the first try of the tournament and he followed that up with a double against Samoa.

Kerevi was a member of the ARU's National Academy in 2012 and 2013. He was selected for Australia Under-20 to play in the 2013 IRB Junior World Championship in France, but was unable to take part due to a shoulder injury.

In July 2013, he signed an extended player squad contract with the Queensland Reds for the 2014 Super Rugby season.

In June 2016, he was included in the 33-member Australia team for the 2016 England rugby union tour of Australia. He made his debut at inside centre against England, in the defeat in Brisbane. Australia would go on to be white-washed in the series 3–0.

Kerevi continues to play regularly for the Australian team and featured in their squad for the 2019 Rugby World Cup. Following the world cup Kerevi signed with Japanese club Suntory Sungoliath who he is currently playing for in the Top League.

Kerevi was a member of the Australian men's rugby seven's squad at the Tokyo 2020 Olympics. The team came third in their pool round and then lost to Fiji 19-nil in the quarterfinal. Full details.

Reference list

External links
Stats on itsrugby.fr

1993 births
Australian rugby union players
Australian people of I-Taukei Fijian descent
Queensland Reds players
Brisbane City (rugby union) players
Rugby union centres
People educated at Brisbane State High School
Living people
Sportspeople from Lautoka
I-Taukei Fijian people
People from Ba Province
Fijian emigrants to Australia
Australia international rugby union players
Rugby sevens players at the 2020 Summer Olympics
Olympic rugby sevens players of Australia
Tokyo Sungoliath players
Rugby sevens players at the 2022 Commonwealth Games